Parkers leaf-toed gecko (Hemidactylus megalops) is a species of gecko. It is endemic to Somalia.

References

Hemidactylus
Reptiles described in 1932
Taxa named by Hampton Wildman Parker
Reptiles of Somalia
Endemic fauna of Somalia